St. John's-Kilmarnock School (SJK) is an elite, private school in Waterloo Region, Ontario, operating under the International Baccalaureate program. The school is widely described as one of the country's most prestigious preparatory schools, and has graduated many notable alumni. SJK has 425 students and is a highly selective school, accepting approximately 20% of applicants in 2021. The school attracts a significant minority of international boarding students and has a generous financial aid program, with more than $500,000 being awarded annually to Canadian citizens. 

The school is divided into four houses whose namesake is attributed to historical Canadian figures; Brock, Brant, Simcoe, and Tecumseh. Aside from its main structure, the Waterloo campus has a number of sports facilities, staff and faculty residences, a ceremonial chapel, a pond and corresponding boathouse, and an extensive network of forested trails.

SJK was founded in 1972 by the St. John's Anglican church. Following the St. John's School Act, passed by the Ontarian legislative assembly with royal assent, St. John's School for boys in Elora, Ontario was established. In 1976, a jointly-administered St. Margaret's school for girls was opened in Elora, and, in 1989, following the amalgamation of St. John's and St. Margaret's Schools, the united campus was relocated to Waterloo region. Today, SJK is an interdenominational institution, preserving its Anglican affiliation solely for ceremonial purposes. The school is now more diverse, drawing on a medley of cultural and economic backgrounds from the Waterloo region.

History 

In November 1971, one year before the opening of SJK, a group of people organized in St. John's Anglican church to discuss the opening of a local boys school.  The next year, the opening date of the school was finalized as September 1972.  The legislative assembly passed the St. John's School (Elora, Ontario, Canada) act in 1972 with royal assent.

In May 1976, the St. Margaret's school for girls was opened in Elora. The two schools shared school buses, which brought in students from the Waterloo and Guelph region. They also shared St. John's Church for daily morning prayers, except on Fridays in which a longer service was held at the end of the school day.

In 1989, the boy's and girl's programs joined after the amalgamation of St. John's and St. Margaret's schools in 1985. The school was moved to a temporary location on Phillip Street in Waterloo. In 1988, a 36-acre lot of land was purchased in Breslau and the construction began on the campus later that year.  The new school door's opened for students in January 1990, and the campus was officially opened in 1995. Facilities have since been added to the Breslau campus to improve on academic and co-curricular activities.

References

Educational institutions established in 1972
Elementary schools in the Regional Municipality of Waterloo
High schools in the Regional Municipality of Waterloo
International Baccalaureate schools in Ontario
Private schools in Ontario
Buildings and structures in Woolwich, Ontario